Snorri Snorrason (born 14 July 1977 in Reykjavík, Iceland) is an Icelandic singer who rose to popularity after winning Idol Stjörnuleit 3, the Icelandic version of Pop Idol. Snorri compares his vocal style to Axl Rose & includes Robert Plant as his biggest influence, his favourite Icelandic artist is Jet Black Joe.
Snorri was a contestant in the Icelandic selection to eurovision song contest but did not make it to the final.

Idol Stjörnuleit 3 performances
Semi Finals: Can't Cry Hard Enough by The Williams Brothers
Top 12: Fuzzy by Grant Lee Buffalo
Top 11: The Weight by The Band
Top 10: Give A Little Bit by Supertramp
Top 9: You To Me Are Everything by The Real Thing
Top 8: Dagný by Sigfús Halldórsson
Top 7: Sunny Afternoon by The Kinks
Top 6: Fly Me To The Moon by Frank Sinatra
Top 5: Skýið by Björgvin Halldórsson
Top 4: Sweet Child O' Mine by Guns N' Roses
Top 4: Annie's Song by John Denver
Top 3: Wake Me Up When September Ends by Green Day
Top 3: You Raise Me Up by Westlife
Grand Final: Allt Sem Ég Á
Grand Final: Feel by Robbie Williams
Grand Final: He Ain't Heavy, He's My Brother by The Hollies

Discography

Albums
2006: Allt Sem Ég Á

Singles
2006: "Allt Sem Ég Á"
"Farin Burt"
2010: "Æskuást"

References

External links
 Stöð2 Biography/Interview

1977 births
Living people
People from Reykjavík
Idol stjörnuleit
Idols (TV series) winners
21st-century Icelandic male singers